Rudy Ramcharan (born 1964 in Trinidad) is a Canadian curler from Edmonton, Alberta. He played second for three seasons for Kevin Martin from 1996–97 to 1998–99. He won a Brier as a member of the team in 1997.

Ramcharan joined the team in 1996, and became the first visible minority to win the Brier, being of West Indies descent. The team won the 1997 Labatt Brier and then finished fourth at 1997 Ford World Curling Championships. Ramcharan is one of only two visible minorities to have won the Brier, the other being Bryan Miki, who won the Brier in 2000 with Greg McAulay.

Ramcharan was replaced by Carter Rycroft on the team in 1999, and has since all but disappeared from the curling world. Much of this has to do with a bonspiel he organized in 1999, known as the "World Open Classic". It was originally going to have a purse of $250,000, but due to lack of sponsorships, it was reduced to just $25,000, and many top teams pulled out, embarrassing Ramcharan.

Teams

Personal life
Ramcharan moved to Alberta at the age of 5 and grew up in Alliance, Alberta, where he also golfed. He began curling at the age of 12 or 13. At the time of the 1997 Brier, he was employed as a computer consultant.

References

External links
 Rudy Ramcharan - Curling Canada Stats Archive

Living people
Curlers from Edmonton
Canadian male curlers
Canadian people of Indian descent
Canadian Hindus
Brier champions
Trinidad and Tobago emigrants to Canada
1964 births
Trinidad and Tobago sportsmen